Yakovlevka is a rural locality in Artyukhovsky Selsoviet Rural Settlement, Oktyabrsky District, Kursk Oblast, Russia. Population:

Geography 
The village is located on the Dichnya River (a left tributary of the Seym River), 59 km from the Russia–Ukraine border, 29 km south-west of Kursk, 13 km south-west of the district center – the urban-type settlement Pryamitsyno, 2 km from the selsoviet center – Artyukhovka.

 Climate
Yakovlevka has a warm-summer humid continental climate (Dfb in the Köppen climate classification).

Transport 
Yakovlevka is located 21.5 km from the federal route  Crimea Highway (a part of the European route ), 2 km from the road of regional importance  ("Crimea Highway" – Ivanino, part of the European route ), 0.5 km from the road of intermunicipal significance  (38K-010 – Verkhnyaya Malykhina), 7.5 km from the nearest railway halt 439 km (railway line Lgov I — Kursk).

The rural locality is situated 41 km from Kursk Vostochny Airport, 118 km from Belgorod International Airport and 241 km from Voronezh Peter the Great Airport.

References

Notes

Sources

Rural localities in Oktyabrsky District, Kursk Oblast